The Men's Shot Put F11-12 had its Final held on September 16 at 17:15.

Medalists

Results

References
Final

Athletics at the 2008 Summer Paralympics